Bont Fawr is a tiny hamlet in Carmarthenshire, Wales.

Villages in Carmarthenshire